The 2018 Gerry Weber Open was a tennis tournament played on outdoor grass courts. It was the 26th edition of the event and part of the ATP World Tour 500 series of the 2018 ATP World Tour. It took place at the Gerry Weber Stadion in Halle, Germany, between 18 and 24 June 2018.

Points and prize money

Point distribution

Prize money 

*per team

Singles main-draw entrants

Seeds 

 1 Rankings are as of June 11, 2018

Other entrants 
The following players received wildcards into the singles main draw:
  Maximilian Marterer
  Florian Mayer
  Rudolf Molleker
 
The following players received as a special exempt:
  Matthew Ebden

The following players received entry from the qualifying draw:
  Matthias Bachinger
  Denis Kudla
  Lukáš Lacko
  Mikhail Youzhny

The following players received entry as lucky losers:
  Matteo Berrettini
  Nikoloz Basilashvili

Withdrawals 
Before the tournament
  Chung Hyeon → replaced by  Jan-Lennard Struff
  John Isner → replaced by  Márton Fucsovics
  Albert Ramos Viñolas → replaced by  Matteo Berrettini
  Andrey Rublev → replaced by  Malek Jaziri
  Peter Gojowczyk → replaced by  Nikoloz Basilashvili

Doubles main-draw entrants

Seeds

1 Rankings are as of June 11, 2018

Other entrants
The following pairs received wildcards into the doubles main draw:
  Philipp Kohlschreiber /  Philipp Petzschner
  Jan-Lennard Struff /  Tim Pütz

The following pair received entry from the qualifying draw:
  Jonathan Erlich /  Nicholas Monroe

Champions

Singles

  Borna Ćorić def.  Roger Federer, 7–6(8–6), 3–6, 6–2

Doubles

  Łukasz Kubot /  Marcelo Melo def.  Alexander Zverev /  Mischa Zverev, 7–6(7–1), 6–4

External links 
 Official website
 ATP website